Åros is a village in Røyken in Asker municipality in Viken county, Norway. The population of Åros (2005) is about 1 142.

Location
Åros is located on the peninsula of Hurumlandet along the western side of the Oslofjord. The river Åroselva, which has long been a reliable source of power for sawmills, runs through the village. Åros is situated north of the village of  Sætre, about 40 km south of Oslo and 25 km southeast of Drammen.  Norwegian County Road 11 (Fylkesvei 11) runs through Åros from Krokodden to Sætre. The closest railway station is located at Røyken.

Åros Church 
Åros is the location of Åros Church (Åros kirke) which dates from 1903. The chapel is constructed of wood after plans drawn by architect Alfred Christian Dahl. The  building has a rectangular nave and 150 seats. Between 1963 and 1965, major improvements were implemented on the church. It is associated with the Diocese of Tunsberg, with the Church of Norway.

References

Villages in Viken (county)
Villages in Buskerud
Villages in Asker
Villages in Røyken
Røyken